Counter Intelligence is a board game published in 1989 by Zzota Games.

Contents
Counter Intelligence is a game in which each of two places acts as spy master in charge of three agents.

Reception
Mark R Green reviewed Counter Intelligence for Games International magazine, and gave it 2 1/2 stars out of 5, and stated that "It is quite portable and has whiled away a few hours while waiting for trains to get the hang of their normal functions. However, my own feeling is that it could do with an extra level of activity to make it a really good game."

References

Board games introduced in 1989